Escaping the NXIVM Cult: A Mother's Fight to Save Her Daughter is a 2019 A&E television movie that aired on September 21, 2019, as part of its "Ripped from the Headlines" feature film. The film is narrated by Catherine Oxenberg, who also serves as an executive producer, and stars Andrea Roth, Jasper Polish, Sara Fletcher, Kristin Booth, Janet-Laine Green, and Peter Facinelli.

On May 24, 2020, a "Special Edition" of the film aired that featured clips from the "Beyond the Headlines" short that originally followed the film's premiere where Gretchen Carlson interviewed Oxenberg.

Plot

Catherine Oxenberg narrates about the day when she (Andrea Roth) found out that her daughter India (Jasper Polish) has joined the NXIVM cult that is headed by Keith Raniere (Peter Facinelli) and Allison Mack (Sara Fletcher). She goes to a place to find out advice for business but is asked odd questions.

Cast

Production
Catherine Oxenberg produced this film to show the viewers the experiences that her daughter India has gone through. Most of the scenes were filmed in Nova Scotia (The cafe and music school scenes filmed in Dartmouth, Nova Scotia Canada).

Reception

The movie averaged 916,000 viewers on the night it premiered.

References

External links
 
 

2019 television films
2019 films
Biographical films about actors
Films about cults
Films shot in Nova Scotia
Lifetime (TV network) films
NXIVM